Collected is a compilation album by Canadian rapper k-os. The album contains recent tracks from the first three albums, the hit singles, and remixes of a couple singles. The album also contains three new tracks, two of which were leftovers from Atlantis: Hymns for Disco.

Track listing
"Introsuckshun" – 0:46
"Superstarr Pt. Zero" - 4:29
"The Rain" - 3:52
"Man I Used to Be" - 5:03
"Crabbuckit" - 3:47
"Born to Run" - 3:39
"Crucial" - 3:24
"Mushaboom (k-os Mix)" - 4:00
"Sunday Morning (Twilight Mix)" - 4:18
"Equalizer (Go! Remix)" - 4:49
"I Am" - 2:18

References

Hip hop compilation albums
K-os albums
2007 compilation albums